Krakeel River is a town in Sarah Baartman District Municipality in the Eastern Cape province of South Africa.

Village in the Langkloof, east of Avontuur and some 200 km from Port Elizabeth. The name is taken from that of the river. The form Krakeelrivier is preferred for official purposes.

References

Populated places in the Kou-Kamma Local Municipality
http://www.koukammamunicipality.gov.za/